San Diego University for Integrative Studies, also referred to as SDUIS, is a small, private university established in 1999 in San Diego, California, United States.

SDUIS campus is located at 3900 Harney St. in Old Town, San Diego. It also offers a Distance Learning Program. The school offers certificate, bachelors, masters, and doctoral degrees.

Loss of Accreditation 

In December 2021, the California State Bureau for Private Postsecondary Education suspended its approval for SDUIS to operate its degree program.

References

External links 
 Official website

Universities and colleges in San Diego
1999 establishments in California
Educational institutions established in 1999
Private universities and colleges in California